Toussaint (also known as From a Whisper to a Scream in some editions) is a 1971 solo funk, jazz and soul album by Allen Toussaint, his second solo album and his first since the 1950s.

Track listing
All songs written and arranged by Allen Toussaint unless otherwise indicated.
 "From a Whisper To a Scream" – 3:27
 "Chokin' Kind" (Harlan Howard) – 3:23
 "Number Nine" – 3:37
 "Either"  – 2:52
 "Sweet Touch of Love" – 3:20
 "Working in a Coal Mine" – 3:13
 "Everything I Do Gonna Be Funky" – 3:12
 "Louie" – 3:04
 "What is Success" – 3:34
 "Pickles" – 4:27
 "Cast Your Fate to the Wind" (Carel Rowe, Vince Guaraldi)

Personnel

Allen Toussaint – piano and vocal
Mac Rebennack – organ and guitar
Terry Kellman – guitar
Eddie Hohner – bass
Freddie Staehle – drums
John Boudreaux – drums
Ed Greene – drums
Clyde Kerr - trumpet
Earl Turbinton - alto saxophone
Frederic Kemp - tenor saxophone
Merry Clayton - backing vocals
Venetta Fields - backing vocals
Dick Smith - artwork

References

Toussaint
Toussaint
Albums produced by Allen Toussaint
Albums produced by Charles Greene (producer)
DJM Records albums